Adventures Of Jojo is a Bengali children adventure film directed by Raj Chakraborty based on Tongling, a novel by Leela Majumdar.
It is inspired by the film "An Elephant's Journey" directed by Richard Boddington. The film was released on 21 December 2018 under the banner of Shree Venkatesh Films.

Plot
The plot revolves with the subject of tiger poaching and wildlife. Jojo, a young and school going boy of 12, lives with his parents in Kolkata. He dreams of the wilderness and the animals in it. One day his parents go Vellore to take his grandmother. Jojo goes to his uncle's home to Baropahari in Arunachal Pradesh. He befriends with Shibu, a local boy of similar age. Shibu is the son of a mahout who grew up in the midst of nature and is friendly with animals, especially an elephant named Noni. They make a mission to stop a gang of poachers from killing Chenghiz, a huge tiger who is seen as the protector of the forest.

Cast
 Joshojit Banerjee as Jojo
 Rudraneel Ghosh as Munia Hazari
 Raj Chakraborty
 Samiul Alam as Shibu
 Santu Saha as Swapan Mama
 Padmanabha Dasgupta
 Abhishek Singh
 Buddhadeb Bhattacharya
 Manali Dey
 Jayasree Bose
 Jeetu Kamal as Forest Officer Sujoy Bose
 Priya Mondal
 Kunal Banerjee
 Kuntal Banerjee
 Pankaj Mullick
 Pausali Sengupta
 Sanjay Bhattacharya

Soundtrack

Release
The official trailer 1 of the film was launched by SVF on 14 November 2018. The official trailer 2 of the film was launched by SVF, fifteen days later on 1 December 2018. 

This film was theatrically released on 21 December 2018.

References

External links
 

2018 films
Indian children's films
Films based on Indian novels
Indian adventure films
Bengali-language Indian films
2010s Bengali-language films
Films directed by Raj Chakraborty